Astrud Gilberto (born Astrud Evangelina Weinert, March 29, 1940) is a Brazilian samba and bossa nova singer. She gained international attention in the 1960s following her recording of the song "The Girl from Ipanema".

Biography
Astrud Gilberto was born Astrud Evangelina Weinert, the daughter of a Brazilian mother and a German father, in the state of Bahia, Brazil. She was raised in Rio de Janeiro. Her father was a language professor, and she became fluent in several languages. She married João Gilberto in 1959 and had a son, João Marcelo Gilberto, who later joined her band. Astrud and João divorced in the mid-1960s. She has another son from a second marriage, Gregory Lasorsa, who also played with his mother. Later she began a relationship with her husband's musical collaborator, American jazz saxophone player Stan Getz.  She immigrated to the United States in 1963, residing in the U.S. from that time on.

She sang on two tracks on the 1963 album Getz/Gilberto featuring João Gilberto, Stan Getz, and Antônio Carlos Jobim. While it was her first professional recording, Astrud "wasn’t a complete novice. She grew up steeped in music (her mother Evangelina Neves Lobo Weinert played multiple instruments) and sang regularly with her husband in Brazil, including in a concert at the Faculdade de Arquitetura, part of one of Rio de Janeiro’s top universities." Her "beguiling, whispery voice" and steadfast approach to singing played a significant role in popularizing "The Girl from Ipanema", earning a Grammy for Song of the Year and a nomination for Best Vocal Performance by a female.

The 1964 edited single of "The Girl from Ipanema" omitted the Portuguese lyrics sung by João Gilberto, and established Astrud Gilberto as a Bossa Nova singer. It sold over one million copies and was awarded a gold disc. For the recording, it is reported Astrud only ever received the standard session fee, $120. However, according to Gene Lees in Singers and the Song II, Getz asked producer Creed Taylor to ensure she was paid nothing. In 1964, Gilberto appeared in the films Get Yourself a College Girl and The Hanged Man. Her first solo album was The Astrud Gilberto Album (1965). Upon moving to the United States, she went on tour with Getz. Beginning as a singer of bossa nova and American jazz standards, Gilberto started to record her own compositions in the 1970s. She has recorded songs in Portuguese, English, Spanish, Italian, French, German, and Japanese.

In 1982, Gilberto's son Marcelo joined her group, touring with her for more than a decade as bassist. In addition, he collaborated as co-producer of the albums Live in New York (1996) and Temperance (1997). Her son Gregory Lasorsa played guitar on the Temperance album on the song "Beautiful You", which features singer Michael Franks.

Gilberto received the Latin Jazz USA Award for Lifetime Achievement in 1992, and was inducted into the International Latin Music Hall of Fame in 2002. In 1996, she contributed to the AIDS benefit album Red Hot + Rio produced by the Red Hot Organization, performing the song "Desafinado" (Portuguese for "slightly out of tune", or "off-key") along with George Michael at his invitation. Although she did not officially retire, Gilberto announced in 2002 that she was taking "indefinite time off" from public performances.

Her original recording of "Fly Me to the Moon" was edited as a duet using a recording of the same song by Frank Sinatra for the soundtrack of Down with Love (2003). Her recording "Who Can I Turn To?" was sampled by The Black Eyed Peas in the song "Like That" from the 2005 album Monkey Business. Her vocals on "Berimbau" were sampled by Cut Chemist in his song "The Garden". Her recording of "Once I Loved" was featured in the 2007 film Juno. The "Astrud" track on Basia Trzetrzelewska's 1987 album, Time and Tide, is a tribute to Gilberto.

Gilberto is an advocate of animal rights.

Discography

 The Astrud Gilberto Album (Verve, 1965)
 The Shadow of Your Smile (Verve, 1965)
 Look to the Rainbow (Verve, 1966)
 A Certain Smile, a Certain Sadness with Walter Wanderley (Verve, 1966)
 Beach Samba (Verve, 1967)
 Windy (Verve, 1968)
 I Haven't Got Anything Better to Do (Verve, 1969)
 September 17, 1969 (Verve, 1969)
 Gilberto Golden Japanese Album (Verve, 1969)
 Gilberto with Turrentine (CTI, 1971)
 Now (Perception, 1972)
 That Girl from Ipanema (Image, 1977)
 Plus with James Last (Polydor, 1986)
 Temperance (Pony, 1997)
 Jungle (Magya, 2002)

Bibliography
Bossa Nova: The Story of the Brazilian Music That Seduced the World, Castro, Ruy. 2000. (Published in English in 2003.)
 De Stefano, Gildo, Il popolo del samba, La vicenda e i protagonisti della storia della musica popolare brasiliana, Preface by Chico Buarque de Hollanda, Introduction by Gianni Minà, RAI-ERI, Rome, 2005, 
 De Stefano, Gildo, Saudade Bossa Nova: musiche, contaminazioni e ritmi del Brasile, Preface by Chico Buarque, Introduction by Gianni Minà, Logisma Editore, Firenze, 2017,

References

External links
 
 "Desperately Seeking Astrud Gilberto" by Joey Sweeney, Philadelphia Weekly, June 5, 2002. (Archived at Wayback Machine.)

1940 births
Living people
Grammy Award winners
Latin Grammy Lifetime Achievement Award winners
Bossa nova singers
Brazilian jazz singers
Brazilian songwriters
Música Popular Brasileira singers
HIV/AIDS activists
MGM Records artists
Pony Canyon artists
Verve Records artists
English-language singers from Brazil
Spanish-language singers of Brazil
Italian-language singers of Brazil
French-language singers of Brazil
German-language singers of Brazil
Japanese-language singers of Brazil
Brazilian people of German descent
People from Bahia
20th-century Brazilian women singers
20th-century Brazilian singers
21st-century Brazilian women singers
21st-century Brazilian singers
CTI Records artists
Women in Latin music
Brazilian emigrants to the United States